This is a list of the municipalities in the state of Espírito Santo (ES), located in the North Region of Brazil. Espírito Santo is divided into 78 municipalities, which are grouped into 13 microregions, which are grouped into 4 mesoregions.

See also
Geography of Brazil
List of cities in Brazil

Espirito Santo